Tracy Mackenna (1963) is a British sculptor and artist, creating works with her partner Edwin Janssen. She was Course Director at Duncan of Jordanstone College of Art and Design.

Education
Tracy Mackenna studied at the Glasgow School of Art between 1981 and 1986. She is a Royal Scottish Academy's Academician.

Career
In 1986 and 1987, Mackenna worked and lived in Hungary. Exhibitions of her works were held in Hungary, France, Ireland and Scotland during that time period.

Returning to Glasgow, Mackenna was a founding director of Glasgow Sculpture Studios in 1988.  She produced If Crocodiles flew on wings.... as an artist in residence at the Glasgow Garden Festival. She has lectured at Gray's School of Art in Aberdeen. Mackenna has been a Course Director for the Master of Fine Arts program at Duncan of Jordanstone College of Art and Design.

Mackenna and Edwin Janssen create multidisciplinary works for exhibition with themes such as cultural identity, concepts of place, and life and death.

Her affiliations include Board of the Scottish Sculpture Workshop, Faculty of Fine Arts at The British School at Rome, Steering Group Pépinières Européennes pour Jeunes Artistes and The Scottish Arts Council's Reference Group for National Policy for Public Art and Visual Arts Awards Panel.

Works
A partial list of works of Tracy Mackenna and Edwin Janssen: 
 Ed and Ellis in Schiedam (1998)
 The Netherlands, (2012)
 The Poem Pedlar (2012)
 War as Ever (2012)
 Seeing is Believing (Onomatopee, Eindhoven)
 Truth, Error, Opinion
 Shotgun Wedding
 A Perfect Image of Ourselves

Galleries and museums
Her works have been shown in:
Cooper Gallery, Huntington, New York
Collective Gallery, London, 1986
Graeme Murray Gallery, Edinburgh, 1988
Duna Gallery, Budapest, 1988
Migros Museum für Gegenwartskunst, Zürich
Scottish National Portrait Gallery, Edinburgh
Museum of Contemporary Art Tokyo
Ikon Gallery, Birmingham
Centre for Contemporary Arts, Glasgow

References

External links
Tracy Mackenna and Edwin Janssen

1963 births
Living people